The Missouri Photo Workshop is an annual week-long photojournalism school based in Lee Hills Hall at the Missouri School of Journalism in Columbia, Missouri. Founded in 1949 by the "Father of Photojournalism" Cliff Edom along with American economist, federal government official, and photographer Roy Stryker and photographer Russell Lee, the workshop originally sought to instruct others in photojournalism based on the "gritty, content-rich photographs" produced by the pre-World War II (pre-1939) Farm Security Administration, a United States government effort during the Great Depression to combat American rural poverty. Following Edom's credo - "Show truth with a camera. Ideally truth is a matter of personal integrity. In no circumstances will a posed or faked photograph be tolerated." - each workshop originates in a different small town in Missouri, which is used as a backdrop for attendees from the United States and other countries to work on photograph storytelling methods such as research, observation, and timing. Missouri Photo Workshop faculty members have included the White House's first photo editor and NPPA Picture Editor of the Year Sandra Eisert and other prominent photojournalists.

Faculty and students
This list of Missouri Photo Workshop faculty includes current, former, and deceased lecturers at the annual Missouri Photo Workshop (MPW), an annual week-long photojournalism school founded in 1949 and based in Lee Hills Hall at the Missouri School of Journalism in Columbia, Missouri, United States.

Selected publication

See also
 Maine Media Workshops, non-profit educational organization
 Pictures of the Year International, photojournalism program affiliated with the Missouri Photo Workshop

References

Further reading

External links
 

American photography organizations
Art schools in Missouri
Digital media schools
Education in Columbia, Missouri
Missouri culture
Organizations based in Missouri
Photojournalism organizations
University of Missouri
1949 establishments in Missouri